Sinocyclocheilus multipunctatus is a species of ray-finned fish in the genus Sinocyclocheilus.

References 

multipunctatus
Fish described in 1931